"Thanasphere" is a short story by Kurt Vonnegut, first published on 2 September 1950 in Collier's Weekly, and later in Bagombo Snuff Box in 1999.

Short stories by Kurt Vonnegut
1952 short stories